A public lecture (also known as an open lecture) is one means employed for educating the public in the arts and sciences. The Royal Institution has a long history of public lectures and demonstrations given by prominent experts in the field. In the 19th century, the popularity of the public lectures given by Sir Humphry Davy at the Royal Institution was so great that the volume of carriage traffic in Albemarle Street caused it to become the first one-way street in London. The Royal Institution's Christmas Lectures for young people are nowadays also shown on television. Alexander von Humboldt delivered a series of public lectures at the University of Berlin in the winter of 1827–1828, that formed the basis for his later work Kosmos.

Besides public lectures, public autopsies have been important in promoting knowledge of medicine. The public autopsy of Dr. Johann Gaspar Spurzheim, advocate of phrenology, was conducted after his death, and his brain, skull, and heart were removed, preserved in jars of alcohol, and put on display to the public.   Public autoposies have sometimes verged on entertainment: American showman P. T. Barnum held a public autopsy of Joice Heth after her death. Heth was a woman whom Barnum had been featuring as being over 160 years old. Barnum charged 50 cents admission. The autopsy demonstrated that she had in fact been between 76 and 80 years old.

References

See also 
 Collège de France
 Lecture
 List of public lecture series

External links 
 Online Lectures. Webcasts
 Lecturefinder: Search academic and college grade lectures online.
 platformed.org: A New York-based organization advocating public lecture attendance.
 yovisto.com: An academic e-lecture search engine.
 Open Lectures & Talks : Find lists of UK public lectures and talks

Teaching
Public speaking
Lecture series